Platyptilia gondarensis is a moth of the family Pterophoridae. It is known from Ethiopia.

References

gondarensis
Endemic fauna of Ethiopia
Insects of Ethiopia
Moths of Africa
Moths described in 1994